1458 is the integer after 1457 and before 1459.

The maximum determinant of an 11 by 11 matrix of zeroes and ones is 1458.

1458 is one of three numbers which, when its base 10 digits are added together, produces a sum which, when multiplied by its reversed self, yields the original number:

 1 + 4 + 5 + 8 = 18
 18 × 81 = 1458

The only other non-trivial numbers with this property are 81 and 1729, as well as the trivial solutions 1 and 0. It was proven by Masahiko Fujiwara.

References

Integers